The Shire of Peak Downs was a local government area in the Central Highlands of Queensland, Australia, 320 km west of both Rockhampton and Mackay. On 15 March 2008 the shires of Duaringa, Emerald, Bauhinia and Peak Downs were amalgamated to form the Central Highlands Region.

History
Yambina (also known as Jambina and Jambeena) is an Australian Aboriginal language of Central Queensland. Its traditional language region is the local government area of Central Highlands Region, including Peak Downs, Logan Creek, south to Avon Downs, east to Denham Range and Logan Downs, west to Elgin Downs and at Solferino.
On 11 November 1879, the Belyando Division was established as one of 74 divisions around Queensland under the Divisional Boards Act 1879.

On 20 September 1884, Peak Downs Division was separated from the southern part of Belyando Division.

On 31 March 1903, Peak Downs Division became the Shire of Peak Downs.

In 1927, the shire's offices were located in Capella.

In 2008, the shire's offices were located at 24 Conran Street. The Peak Downs Cemetery was also located in Capella.

Towns and localities
The Shire of Peak Downs included the following settlements:

Towns:
 Capella
 Tieri

Economy
It had about 4,000 inhabitants, the primary economic activities in the shire are coal mining, farming and grazing.

The Shire is part of the Bowen Basin, a major coal deposit.  Mining began in the shire in the late 1970s with the opening of Gregory coal mine in 1979, which was followed by Mount Isa Mines' Oaky Creek coal mine in 1983. Oaky Creek was also the reason behind the construction of the township of Tieri, whose sole purpose was to house the workforce that was required to operate Oaky Creek. Three more mines were opened in the 1990s – Ensham/Yongala, Crinum and Gordonstone (later purchased by Rio Tinto and renamed Kestrel coal mine).

Peak Downs is also an area of intensive agricultural production, which is made possible by its  black soil plains and is typified by the abundance and variety of grains in the Shire.  Grains planted include sorghum, wheat, barley, sunflower and more recently chickpeas.

Chairmen and mayors

Chairmen 
 1927: Percy Charles Allan

Mayors 
In 1993, the Local Government Act Number 70 was introduced; it included that all heads of local government councils should be known as mayors and all other elected representatives were to be known as councillors.
 2008: John Brown

References

External links

Queensland Department of Local Government & Planning - Local Government Directory

Former local government areas of Queensland
2008 disestablishments in Australia
Populated places disestablished in 2008
1884 establishments in Australia
Central Highlands Region